Pallas is an Estonian art association, which was established in 1918 in Tartu. The association was re-established in 1988 in Tartu.

In 1919, the society established Pallas Art School.

Notable members before 1940:
 Konrad Mägi
 Aleksander Tassa
 Ado Vabbe 
 Marie Reisik
 Nikolai Triik
 Ants Laikmaa
 Kristjan Raud
 Eduard Rüga
 Aleksander Vardi

References

Estonian art
Estonian artist groups and collectives